Storytelling is an album by French jazz fusion artist Jean-Luc Ponty, released in 1989. It is his second album on the Columbia label.

Track listing 
All songs by Jean-Luc Ponty unless otherwise noted.
"In the Fast Lane" – 4:09
"Tender Memories" – 5:20
"Spring Episode" – 5:52
"Pastoral Harmony" – 4:22
"The Storyteller" – 4:26
"The Amazon Forest" – 4:27
"After the Storm" – 4:21
"A Journey's End" – 4:24
"Chopin Prelude No. 20 (with violin improvisation) (Frédéric Chopin) – 2:59

Personnel 
 Jean-Luc Ponty – violin, Synclavier synthesizer, keyboards
 Grover Washington Jr. – soprano saxophone (track 2)
 Jamie Glaser – electric guitar
 Wally Minko – piano, keyboards
 Clara Ponty – piano (track 9)
 Patrice Rushen – synthesizer (track 2), synth solo (track 7)
 Baron Browne – electric bass
 Rayford Griffin – drums, percussion
 Kurt Wortman – percussion (track 6)

Production notes
 Jean-Luc Ponty – producer
 Brian Malouf – producer, engineer, mixing
 John Anthony – engineer
 Erik Zobler – engineer
 Peter Kelsey – overdub engineer
 Jeff Poe – assistant engineer, assistant tracking engineer
 Bernie Grundman – mastering
 David Coleman – art direction
 Nancy Donald – art direction
 John Cutcliffe – production coordination
 Kevin Fisher – studio assistant
 Lawrence Fried – studio assistant
 Adam Silverman – studio assistant

Charts

References

External links 
 Jean-Luc Ponty - Storytelling (1989) album review by Scott Yanow, credits & releases at AllMusic
 Jean-Luc Ponty - Storytelling (1989) album releases & credits at Discogs
 Jean-Luc Ponty - Storytelling (1989) album to be listened as stream on Spotify

1989 albums
Jean-Luc Ponty albums
Columbia Records albums